The 1957–58 Oberliga  was the thirteenth season of the Oberliga, the first tier of the football league system in West Germany. The league operated in five regional divisions, Berlin, North, South, Southwest and West. The five league champions and the runners-up from the west, south, southwest and north then entered the 1959 German football championship which was won by FC Schalke 04. It was Schalke's seventh and last national championship and its first since 1942.

A similar-named league, the DDR-Oberliga, existed in East Germany, set at the first tier of the East German football league system. The 1958 DDR-Oberliga was won by ASK Vorwärts Berlin.

Oberliga Nord
The 1957–58 season saw two new clubs in the league, Phönix Lübeck and VfB Lübeck, both promoted from the Amateurliga. The league's top scorer was Werner Thamm of Eintracht Braunschweig with 23 goals.

Oberliga Berlin
The 1957–58 season saw two new clubs in the league, Alemannia 90 Berlin and Wacker 04 Berlin, both promoted from the Amateurliga Berlin. The league's top scorer was Dieter Blümchen of Viktoria 89 Berlin with 19 goals.

Oberliga West
The 1957–58 season saw two new clubs in the league, Sportfreunde Hamborn and Rot-Weiß Oberhausen, both promoted from the 2. Oberliga West. The league's top scorer was Alfred Kelbassa of Borussia Dortmund with 24 goals.

Oberliga Südwest
The 1957–58 season saw two new clubs in the league, SV St. Ingbert and TuRa Ludwigshafen, both promoted from the 2. Oberliga Südwest. The league's top scorer was Friedel Trapp of TuRa Ludwigshafen with 29 goals, the highest total for any scorer in the five Oberligas in 1957–58.

Oberliga Süd
The 1957–58 season saw two new clubs in the league, TSV 1860 München and SSV Reutlingen, both promoted from the 2. Oberliga Süd. The league's top scorer was Siegfried Gast of Kickers Offenbach with 20 goals.

German championship

The 1958 German football championship was contested by the nine qualified Oberliga teams and won by FC Schalke 04, defeating Hamburger SV in the final. The runners-up of the Oberliga West and Südwest played a pre-qualifying match which had to be replayed as it originally ended in a three-all draw after extra time. The remaining eight clubs then played a single round of matches at neutral grounds in two groups of four. The two group winners then advanced to the final.

Qualifying

|}
Replay

|}

Group 1

Group 2

Final

|}

References

Sources
 30 Jahre Bundesliga  30th anniversary special, publisher: kicker Sportmagazin, published: 1993
 kicker-Almanach 1990  Yearbook of German football, publisher: kicker Sportmagazin, published: 1989, 
 DSFS Liga-Chronik seit 1945  publisher: DSFS, published: 2005
 100 Jahre Süddeutscher Fußball-Verband  100 Years of the Southern German Football Federation, publisher: SFV, published: 1997

External links
 The Oberligas on Fussballdaten.de 

1957-58
1
Ger